Susan Salms-Moss (born Susan Leslie Moss, April 28, 1946) is an opera singer who made her career singing leading soprano roles throughout Europe. She appeared in numerous theaters in Germany, and throughout Europe, and is best known in dramatic soprano roles. She also has a business translating German texts into English.

Biography

Early life and education
Salms-Moss was born on April 28, 1946, in Brooklyn, New York, the daughter of Louis B. Moss, a manufacturer, and Dorris Teicher Moss, a homemaker. Her mother's family stemmed from near Lviv, which was then part of the Austro-Hungarian Empire, and her father's family came from Odessa and the surrounding countryside. Both sides of the family are Jewish. She grew up on Long Island and graduated from Great Neck South High School in 1963. In 1967, she earned her B.A. from Brown University, where she majored in French literature. At the same time, she studied voice and performed in concerts and onstage (e.g. Polly in The Threepenny Opera).

After college, Salms-Moss moved to New York City and worked as part of a research project in foreign language teaching and testing methods at the Modern Language Association, while continuing to study voice privately, especially with Else Seyfert. Conductor Laszlo Halasz, founding music director of the New York City Opera, encouraged Salms-Moss to go to Geneva, Switzerland, in 1968 and study with Maria Carpi, best known for having trained soprano Gwyneth Jones. The year of music studies at the Conservatoire de Genève convinced Salms-Moss to pursue a career in opera. In 1977, she earned a music degree, with distinction, at the Musikhochschule Rheinland (then called Robert-Schumann-Institut) in Düsseldorf, Germany, where she studied with Wagnerian soprano Astrid Varnay. She also sang opera excerpts on Dutch television and radio.

Career
Salms-Moss made her professional opera debut only a few months later, as the leading soprano at the Städtische Bühnen (state theatre) in Münster, Germany, singing the role of Amelia in Verdi's Un ballo in maschera. Early roles included Mimi and Musetta in La Bohème, Violetta in La Traviata, Marguerite in Faust, and Mozart roles such as the Countess in The Marriage of Figaro, Fiordiligi in Cosi fan tutte and Donna Elvira in Don Giovanni. Her career took her to numerous theaters in Germany in the following years; from 1986 until 1999 she was a member of the Städtische Bühnen in Regensburg, Germany, while also accepting contracts throughout Europe, including Vienna. She also played the title role in Bellini's Norma and Abigaille in Verdi's Nabucco. The critic of Die Woche wrote, "Her Abigaille is a donna di forza, strong in expression and intensely sung – listen to the octave jumps in "Qual Dio vi salva" – she carries out this delicate role with bravura."

She also sang the Verdi heroines in Aida, Desdemona in Otello, Leonora in La Forza del Destino, Alice in Falstaff and Leonora in Il Trovatore. Her Puccini roles included the title character in Tosca and Giorgetta in Il Tabarro. She has played all three Janáček heroines, Katya Kabanova, Jenufa, and Emilia Marty in The Makropoulos Case. Ventures into modern repertoire included Fevronia in Rimsky-Korsakov's The Legend of the Invisible City of Kitezh, Marie in Berg's Wozzeck, and Die Dame in Hindemith's Cardillac. Rare departures into traditionally mezzo-soprano repertoire were Mélisande in Debussy's Pelléas et Mélisande and Weir's Blond Eckbert. Lighter pieces included classical operettas, especially Rormaosalinde in Die Fledermaus, and the Mother Abbess in The Sound of Music in Innsbruck in its first Austrian production. She performed the major works of Richard Strauss, such as Salome, the Feldmarschallin in Der Rosenkavalier, and, having sung Chrysothemis in Elektra earlier, Elektra herself. She also played Katerina in Shostakovich's Lady Macbeth of Mtsensk. Salms-Moss's concert programs included works in several languages and styles, in particular the French and Russian repertoire.

Salms-Moss became fluent in English, French, German, Italian and Russian. Parallel with her singing career, she became a translator of German texts, including a number of published full-length books, and a member of the international translating group ExperTeam and is currently a freelance translator based in New York.

Personal
Salms-Moss was married to Karl-Heinz Salms, a German interior designer, from 1974 to 2009, and has two daughters, who have performed with her on stage. She currently resides in New York City.

References

External links
 Brown Alumni Magazine
 Biography

1946 births
Pembroke College in Brown University alumni
American women singers
Living people
People from Brooklyn
People from Great Neck, New York
21st-century American women